The women's tournament of football at the 2009 Summer Universiade in Serbia began on June 30 and ended on July 10, 2009.

Teams

Preliminary round

Group A

Group B

Group C

Group D

Classification 9-15 places

Quarterfinals

Classification round

Classification 13–15 places

Classification 9–12 places

Classification 5–8 places

Semifinals

Finals

13th place game

11th place game

9th place game

7th place game

5th place game

Bronze medal match

Gold medal match

Final standings

Goalscorers

10 goals
  Jeon Ga-eul
8 goals
  Ekaterina Sochneva
6 goals
  Jodie Taylor
5 goals
  Anna Żelazko
  Lee Eun-mi
  Halina Poltorak
  Jovana Sretenović

External links
Reports

2009
Women
2009 in women's association football